"Hill Street Blues" is a 1981 instrumental by Mike Post.  It is the theme from the TV series Hill Street Blues, and features Larry Carlton on guitar.

The single spent over five months on the charts and reached number 10 on the U.S. Billboard Hot 100.  It became an Adult Contemporary hit in the U.S. (No. 4) and Canada (No. 29). It became Post's second Top 10 hit, matching the performance of his first hit in 1975, "Theme from the Rockford Files". The single also charted in the UK (No. 25).

Notable covers
 Jazz pianist Rodney Franklin on his 1981 LP, Endless Flight.
 Richard Clayderman on Special Requests 2001.

Chart history

Weekly charts

Year-end charts

References

External links
 

1981 songs
1981 singles
1980s instrumentals
Elektra Records singles
Television drama theme songs
Song recordings produced by Mike Post